The following men have coached the Papua New Guinea national rugby league team in international test competition.

List of coaches

See also

List of current NRL coaches
List of current NRL Women's coaches

References

R
PNG